Bharti Kirchner is an American author. She is the author of ten books—six novels and four cookbooks—and has been publishing since 1992. She has written numerous articles and essays on food, travel, fitness, and lifestyle. She has won two Seattle Arts Commission literature grants, and an Artist Trust GAP grant. Her work has been translated into German, Dutch, Spanish, Marathi, Thai and other languages.

Prior to becoming a writer, Kirchner worked as a systems engineer for IBM and as a systems manager for Bank of America, San Francisco. She has also worked in Europe and other continents as a computer systems consultant.

Books

Novels
Die Sonnen Tänzerin
Shiva Dancing (1998)
Sharmila's Book (1999) 
Darjeeling (2002) 
Pastries: A Novel of Desserts and Discoveries (2003)
Tulip Season (2012)
Goddess of Fire
Season of Sacrifice (2017)

Cookbooks
The Healthy Cuisine of India (1992)
Indian Inspired (1993)
The Bold Vegetarian (1995)
Vegetarian Burgers (1996)

References

External links
 Official home page
 As American As Apple Pie Rediff - June 10, 1999
 

20th-century American novelists
21st-century American novelists
American cookbook writers
American women writers of Indian descent
American people of Marathi descent
American Hindus
Year of birth missing (living people)
Living people
American women novelists
20th-century American women writers
21st-century American women writers